Losco is an Italian surname. Notable people with the name include:

 Andrea Losco (born 1951), Italian politician and member of the European Parliament
 Ira Losco (born 1981), Maltese singer and competitor in the Eurovision Song Contest

See also
 Loscos, Spanish municipality